The Jouybareh district is the oldest district of Isfahan. The district originates in the early Achaemenid era and because of the immigration of the babylonian jews on the order of Cyrus the Great. This district was called Dar ol-Johoud (Residential area of jews) until the 12th century, but later it was known as Jahanbareh and Jouybareh and became one of the districts of Isfahan. In the Seljuq era, the district became the center of the city Isfahan. For that reason, there are very old historical structures like Sarban minaret and Chehel Dokhtaran minaret in this district.

References 

Isfahan
Districts of Isfahan Province
Populated places with period of establishment missing